The 19419 / 19420 Chennai Central–Ahmedabad Express is an Express train belonging to Indian Railways that run between Chennai Central railway station and  in India.

Service 
It operates as train number 19419 from Chennai Central  to Ahmedabad Junction and as train number 19420 in the reverse direction, serving the states of Tamil Nadu, Andhra Pradesh, Karnataka, Maharashtra and Gujarat.

The Mas–Adi Express – 19419  runs on 2 days per week (Thursday and Sunday) and on return Adi–Mas Express – 19420 runs on Wednesday and Saturday.

The train 19419 is named as MAS ADI EXPRESS. It leaves Chennai at 20:00 on day 1 and reaches Ahmedabad at 05:35 on day 3.It takes 33 hrs 35 mins to reach from its source to the destination.

On return, it leaves Ahmedabad at 09:40 on day 1 and reaches Chennai at 17:10 on day 2. It takes 31 hrs 30 mins to reach from its source to the destination.

Coaches

The service presently has one AC 2 Tier, four AC 3 Tier, seven Sleeper coaches and four General Unreserved coaches and currently powered by LHB rake.

As with most train services in India, coach composition may be amended at the discretion of Indian Railways depending on demand.

Routing

Traction
As this route is partially electrified, a Arakkonam / Vijayawada-based WAP-4 locomotive pulls the train to  then a Pune-based WDP-4D locomotive pulls the train to  later a Vadodara-based WAP-7 locomotive pulls the train to its destination.

Rake sharing
The train shares its rake with 12947/12948 Azimabad Express.

References

External links
19419 Chennai Central–Ahmedabad Express at India Rail Info
19420 Ahmedabad–Chennai Central Express at India Rail Info

Express trains in India
Rail transport in Tamil Nadu
Rail transport in Andhra Pradesh
Rail transport in Karnataka
Rail transport in Maharashtra
Rail transport in Gujarat
Transport in Ahmedabad
Transport in Chennai